Westmount City Hall is the seat of local government in Westmount, Quebec, Canada. It is located at 4333 Sherbrooke Street West below Côte Saint Antoine Road.

It was designed by architects Francis R. Findlay and Robert Findlay in the Neo-Tudor style. Its style is reminiscent of Scottish castles, with its central tower and crenelations and turrets. It was completed in 1922, with its cornerstone containing various historical documents being laid on October 14, 1922 by Mayor P.W. McLagan. It underwent a major interior renovation that was completed in 1965.

References

External links
City of Westmount - Official website

Buildings and structures in Westmount, Quebec
Government buildings completed in 1922
City and town halls in Quebec
Tudor Revival architecture in Canada
Robert Findlay buildings